Aleksandr Petrovich Hudilainen (finnicized as Aleksanteri Petrovitš Hutilainen, born May 2, 1956) is a Russian politician. He was the third Head of the Republic of Karelia, a federal subject of Russia. He came into power after Andrey Nelidov left office in 2012. He resigned on February 15, 2017 and was succeeded by Artur Parfenchikov.

He is president of the sport federation of skiing and snowboarding of the Leningrad oblast.

Hudilainen is of Ingrian Finnish heritage. He is fluent in Finnish.

References

External links 
 Karjalan tasavallan päämies Hudilainen Aleksandr 

United Russia politicians
21st-century Russian politicians
People from Kashinsky District
1956 births
Living people
People of Ingrian Finnish descent
Heads of the Republic of Karelia